The National Workers' Union of Afghanistan (NUWA) was the sole labour body of Afghanistan, from 1990 until the Mujahideen rose to power in 1992. Previous to 1990 the Central Council of Afghan Trade Unions (CCATU) fulfilled the same role.

There are currently no reports of collective bargaining mechanisms, strikes, or other organized industrial activity in the country.

References

Trade unions in Afghanistan
Trade unions established in 1990
Trade unions disestablished in 1992
1990 establishments in Afghanistan
1992 disestablishments in Afghanistan
Defunct trade unions of Asia
Defunct organisations based in Afghanistan